Newton College may refer to:
Newton College (Japan)
Newton College (Peru)

See also
Newton College of the Sacred Heart
Newton Abbot College
Newton Theological College